Moon Hill is a  mountain in the U.S. state of New York. It is located north-northeast of Petersburg in Rensselaer County. Moon Hill was named after J. S. Moon.

References

Mountains of Rensselaer County, New York
Hills of New York (state)